Van Denbergh-Simmons House is a historic home located at Colonie in Albany County, New York.  The house was in three phases: the northeast section was built between about 1720 and 1760; the northwest section about 1790; and the south section about 1847. The northeast section is a -story Dutch house with a 1-story porch.  The northwest section is a -story ell containing a large kitchen and bee hive oven.  The south section is a 2-story Italian Villa style addition with a hipped roof and large square tower at the northwest corner. Also on the property are the remains of a barn foundation.

It was listed on the National Register of Historic Places in 1985.

References

Houses on the National Register of Historic Places in New York (state)
Italianate architecture in New York (state)
Houses in Albany County, New York
National Register of Historic Places in Albany County, New York